This is a list of places on the Victorian Heritage Register in the Bass Coast Shire in Victoria, Australia. The Victorian Heritage Register is maintained by the Heritage Council of Victoria.

The Victorian Heritage Register, as of 2021, lists the following seven state-registered places within the Bass Coast Shire:

References 

Bass Coast
+